Femina Miss India Bangalore is a zonal beauty pageant in India. Winners compete in the Femina Miss India national pageant. Initially, it was started as a South Zonal competition, in which contestants from all South Indian States participated. In 2017, it was changed to Femina Miss India Karnataka. This event is part of a new format that is a state-wide competition introduced as Femina Miss India 2017. The winner from this pageant represents the state of Karnataka at the National level Femina Miss India contest.

List of winners of Femina Miss India Bangalore
The following are winners of Femina Miss India Bangalore who represented the Bangalore city at Femina Miss India competition:
 Color key

List of Winners of Femina Miss India Karnataka
The following are the winners of Femina Miss India Karnataka who represented the state of Karnataka at Femina Miss India competition:
 Color key

By number of wins

International pageants

Notes
Femina Miss India Bangalore was introduced in 2013.
The first-ever crowned Miss India Bangalore 2013, Shobitha Dhulipala, was crowned as the first runner-up of this contest.

References

External links
 Articles.timesofindia.indiatimes.com
 Articles.timesofindia.indiatimes.com

Femina Miss India
Female models from Bangalore
Beauty pageants in India
Culture of Bangalore
Indian awards
2013 establishments in Karnataka
Events in Bangalore